George Augustus Buffington (June 29, 1825September 16, 1893) was a philanthropist, businessman, farmer, and politician in the Chippewa Valley of Wisconsin. Buffington was a prominent figure in the area and one of the wealthiest men in the city of Eau Claire.

Life and career
Buffington was born in Little Valley, Cattaraugus County, New York in 1825, the son of Isaiah and Sophia (Winchester) Buffington.

He was raised in Onondaga County, New York, until he was seventeen years old. He then came with his parents to Walworth County, Wisconsin, where he worked at farming, teaming, or anything by which he could make a living. In 1846, he married Pluma A. Jones. In the same year, he bought a piece of land nearby and had a log cabin built. Subsequently, he purchased a stage line running from Kenosha to Beloit. Two years later, he sold the stage line to Frink, Walker & Company. He and his wife moved to Stephenson County, Illinois, where he purchased 160 acres of land and began farming.

In 1850, Buffington sold his land and holdings in Illinois and moved to Dodge County, Wisconsin, where he was appointed Undersheriff and also elected Justice of the peace.  At the same time he made investments in the grocery and sale stable businesses. Through these different endeavors Buffington managed to save $12,000 dollars. At the age of thirty, Buffington came to Eau Claire, Wisconsin where he purchased real estate. In 1857, he relocated his family to the area. He made a brief purchase of the Niagara House, and subsequently began steam boating. From 1858 to 1859, Buffington built the "Chippewa Valley" steamboat, which he ran until 1861. The boat was captured on the White River and burned after the Civil War broke out.

In 1859, Buffington purchased a fifty percent stake in the Ball & Smith sawmills, which were afterward known as the Smith & Buffington Mill Company. In 1874, the company was incorporated as the Valley Lumber Company with Buffington serving as President.

Buffington served as the chairman of the township board for a number of years, and was also elected to serve as the fourth Mayor of Eau Claire in 1875, an office that has since been abolished. He was an alderman on the Eau Claire City Council for several decades, and was also the chairman of the Eau Claire County Board of Supervisors. He was an active member in Freemasonry and the Knights Templar.

Death
Buffington died in 1893 at the age of 68.

Legacy
Buffington Drive is a street on the upper west side of Eau Claire named for Mr. Buffington's contributions to the area. The Buffington Neighborhood Association is on the west side of the city as well.

Buffington is regarded as having the foresight to forecast the quickly drying out industry of logging and its dependent industries at the confluence of the Eau Claire and Chippewa Rivers as early as 1885. He is quoted as saying, "Gentlemen, you had better get something while you can, because we've seen the last sawmill built in Eau Claire." The area would never again be seen as the wellspring of economic activity that it had been. Buffington's quote is displayed on the walking trail of Phoenix Park in downtown Eau Claire.

Buffington is interred at Lakeview Cemetery in Eau Claire.

Notes

Further reading and references
Barland, Lois. The Rivers Flow On. Stevens Point: Warzalla Publishing, 1965.
"Historical and Biographical Album of the Chippewa Valley, Wisconsin" (1891–1892) Pages 407–408

External links
Biography of George Buffington

1825 births
1893 deaths
People from Cattaraugus County, New York
American city founders
Philanthropists from New York (state)
Businesspeople from Wisconsin
Wisconsin city council members
County supervisors in Wisconsin
Mayors of Eau Claire, Wisconsin
19th-century American politicians
19th-century American philanthropists
19th-century American businesspeople
Wisconsin Republicans